Davis's round-eared bat (Lophostoma evotis) is a species of bat in the family Phyllostomidae. It is found in Belize, Guatemala, Honduras, and southeastern Mexico.

Description
Its ears are long with rounded tips. Its fur is dark gray.

It is both frugivorous and insectivorous.

Range and habitat
It is endemic to Central America; its range includes Belize, Guatemala, Honduras, and Mexico. It has only been documented in lowlands.

As of 2018, it is evaluated as a least-concern species by the IUCN.

References

Lophostoma
Mammals described in 1978
Taxonomy articles created by Polbot
Bats of Central America